The Martin Jetpack was a single-person aircraft under development. Despite its name, it did not use a jet pack as such, but ducted fans for lift. Martin Aircraft Company of New Zealand (not related to Glenn L. Martin Company, the US company also known as Martin Aircraft) developed it, and unveiled it at the Experimental Aircraft Association's 2008 AirVenture in Oshkosh, Wisconsin, Wisconsin, US. The US Federal Aviation Administration classified it as an experimental ultralight airplane.

It used a gasoline (petrol) engine with two ducted fans to provide lift. Martin Aircraft initially planned to target first responders as customers. In 2019, the company closed.

History
The Martin Jetpack was under development for over 30 years.  Glenn Neal Martin (not to be confused with Glenn L. Martin, of The Martin Company) started work on it in his Christchurch garage in the 1980s.

New Zealand aviation regulatory authorities approved the Martin Jetpack for a limited set of manned flight tests in 2013.
, the price of the commercial production units was hoped to be 

Glenn Martin suddenly resigned on 4 June 2015 after investing 30 years in the product.

In August 2016, CEO Pete Coker was replaced by the former CFO James West. The company closed its doors in 2019, with KuangChi Science, Martin Aircraft's 52% majority shareholder, looking for a buyer for the few remaining assets.

Description
The Martin Jetpack is a small VTOL device with two ducted fans that provide lift and a  V4 piston  gasoline engine. Although its pilot straps onto it and does not sit, the device cannot be classed as a backpack device because it is too large to be worn while walking.  However, the Martin Jetpack does not meet the Federal Aviation Administration's classification of an ultralight aircraft; it meets weight and fuel restrictions, but it cannot meet the power-off stall speed requirement. The intention is to create a specific classification for the jetpack it uses the same petrol used in cars, is relatively easy to fly, and is cheaper to maintain and operate than other ultralight aircraft. Most helicopters require a tail rotor to counteract the rotor torque, which, along with the articulated head, complicate flying, construction, and maintenance enormously. The Martin Jetpack is designed to be torque neutral it has no tail rotor, no collective, no articulating or foot pedals and this design simplifies flying dramatically. Pitch, roll and yaw are controlled by one hand, height by the other.

Version P12
A further version of the Martin Jetpack was built to prepare for manned flight testing.  The new prototype, with the descriptor P12, had several design improvements over earlier versions, including lowering the position of the Martin Jetpack's ducts, which reportedly resulted in better maneuverability. It also had a fully integrated fly-by-wire system. P12 was to be developed into a first responder production model. A lighter personal jetpack was hoped to be available in 2017.

Safety features
To enhance safety, the finished product was to feature a low-opening ballistic parachute along with carbon-fibre landing gear and pilot module.

Flight testing

A second version, designated prototype P12, of the Martin Jetpack received approval from the New Zealand Civil Aviation Authority (CAA) to begin manned flight testing in August 2013. According to an investor update from August 2016, additional funding would be required to complete the certification process.

Potential markets
However, the delivery date was again postponed.

Governments were expected to be a large share of initial consumers. The first production model was aimed at military and first responder emergency crews, such as police, firefighters, and medical personnel, to enable them to have faster response times, to reach areas inaccessible by road, and to get to the top of tall buildings quickly. Interested buyers included the government of the United Arab Emirates; in November 2015, Dubai (part of the UAE) reportedly had placed an initial order for 20 units, simulators, and training, for delivery in 2016.

Specifications

See also
 SoloTrek XFV
 Backpack helicopter
 NASA Puffin

References

External links
 
 Video of Martin Jetpack in operation
 

Jetpack
Ducted fan-powered aircraft
2000s experimental aircraft
2000s New Zealand ultralight aircraft
New Zealand design
VTOL aircraft
Single-engined twin-prop tractor aircraft
Jet pack